Darsi is a Municipality Town Prakasam district of the Indian state of Andhra Pradesh. Before the British rule, it was also called Darshanapuri, named by an ancient Andhra king. It is the mandal headquarters of Darsi mandal in Kanigiri revenue division. It located at the foot of the Nallamala Hills. Lush, green fields surround the town. It is 20 km away from Podili and 33 km away from Addanki.

Geography

Darsi is located on the Addanki - Podili Road. Darsi is a town at the foot of Nallamala. It is a plain region in coromandal region. It is covered with small mountain ranges to the north, pulipadu pond to the east and lush green fields to the south and west.

Education
There are 11 public primary schools, 12 private primary schools, one government high school, 12 private high schools, three public secondary schools and three private secondary schools.

Prominent schools include:
St. Xavier's High School, Darsi

A.P.Model School
 Kijiji High School
Gowthami Grammar School

Places To Visit

 NAP pond near Darsi Hills
Sai Baba temple near Pulipadu Lake
Venkateswara Swami temple 
Skj power project
Darsi Pallevanam Park
Clock Tower

Assembly constituency

Darsi is an assembly constituency in Andhra Pradesh, one of 12 in Prakasam district. In the last elections, YSRCP (YSR Congress) candidate Maddisetti Venugopal won by a margin of 39057 votes on Kadiri Babu Rao. Dirisala Ramanareddy was the first chairman of Prakasam Zilla Parishad in 1970.
Budamaguntla Balaiah was elected as Mandal Parishad President(M.P.P) in the year 1996.

Water source
The town people are mostly depend on Nagarjunasagar Right Canal (Jawahar canal) for both irrigation & drinking. It passes through Darsi. The town receives rainfall between mid July to September. A fresh water lake built by Netherland's Government.

Transport
There is a bus station in Darsi near the Podili Road, Kurichedu Road and Lankojanapalli Road intersection. There is also a bus stand in Auto Nagar, Darsi. From there, Other Depot buses go to Ongole, Podili, Kanigiri, Pamur, Vinjamur, Atmakuru(N), Udayagiri,
Hyderabad MGBS, Nizampet, Ameerpet, Vinukonda and other destinations. Railway line, Nadikudi-Srikalahasthi is passing (under construction) through the town. It is also well connected by road.

References 

Villages in Prakasam district
Mandal headquarters in Prakasam district